Xana Antunes (17 May 1964 – 27 January 2020) was a British business journalist who was also the executive editor of Quartz. Before joining Quartz, Antunes served as editor of Crain's New York Business and editor-in-chief of the New York Post. She was born Susana Maria Douglas Ramage and later changed her name to accommodate a nickname.

Antunes studied at Trinity & All Saints College (now Leeds Trinity University) in Leeds, West Yorkshire. Earlier in her career she had reporting stints at The Independent and The Evening Standard.

Antunes moved to New York from the United Kingdom in 1993 to work as a foreign correspondent. She joined the New York Post as a deputy business editor in 1995, working under David Yelland. She was appointed editor of the paper in October 1999, before stepping down and being replaced by Col Allan in April 2001. Her resignation was apparently under pressure from Rupert Murdoch.

She was awarded a lifetime achievement award by the Newswomen's Club of New York.

She was married to Scott Schell and had one daughter, Elisabeth.

Antunes died of pancreatic cancer in early 2020.

References

1964 births
2020 deaths
New York Post people
Alumni of Leeds Trinity University
British people of Portuguese descent